Caritas Catholica Belgica is a Belgian confederation of Catholic relief, development and social service organizations operating in Flanders and Wallonia. The organization groups about 1,100 institutions active in healthcare in Belgium.

History
Caritas Catholica Belgica was founded in 1932 at the initiative of the Belgian bishops as the Katholieke Dienst voor Hygiëne en Hulpbetoon. In 1935, the name became Caritas Catholica Belgica. In 1982, the organization was split into Caritas Vlaanderen  (Caritas Catholica Flanders, Flanders) and Caritas en Communauté Française et Germanophone (Caritas Catholica Wallonia, Wallonia) and Caritas International as a national organization.

See also
 Caritas Internationalis
 Caritas Europa
 Guido Van Oevelen
 Willy Geysen

Sources
 75 jaar caritas in Belgie
 Social Work of Religious Welfare Associations in Western Europe

External links
 Caritas Catholica Belgica

Christian organizations established in 1932
Caritas Internationalis
Christian organisations based in Belgium
Medical and health organisations based in Belgium